The following highways are numbered 640:

Canada
 New Brunswick Route 640
 Quebec Autoroute 640
Saskatchewan Highway 640

Ireland
 R640 road (Ireland)

United Kingdom
 A640 road

United States